The Undercover Man is a 1949 American crime film noir directed by Joseph H. Lewis and starring Glenn Ford, Nina Foch and James Whitmore.

Plot
Frank Warren is a treasury agent assigned to put an end to the activities of a powerful mob crime boss. The agent struggles to put together a case   but is frustrated when all he finds are terrified witnesses and corrupt police officers. Although most informants end up dead, Agent Warren gets critical information about the mob from an unlikely source.

Cast
 Glenn Ford as Frank Warren
 Nina Foch as Judith Warren
 James Whitmore as George Pappas
 Barry Kelley as Edward O'Rourke
 David Bauer as Stanley Weinburg (as David Wolfe)
 Frank Tweddell as Insp. Herzog
 Howard St. John as Joseph S. Horan
 John Hamilton as Police Sergeant Shannon
 Leo Penn as Sydney Gordon
 Joan Lazer as Rosa Rocco
 Esther Minciotti as Maria Rocco
 Angela Clarke as Theresa Rocco
 Anthony Caruso as Salvatore Rocco
 Robert Osterloh as Manny Zanger
 Kay Medford as Gladys LaVerne
 Patricia Barry as Muriel Gordon (as Patricia White)
 Frank Mayo as Foreman (uncredited)
 Larry Steers as Man in Audience (uncredited)

Background

The film was based on an article titled "He Trapped Capone," the first part of the autobiography Undercover Man by Federal Agent Frank J. Wilson, which was serialized in Collier's in 1947.

Many details were fictionalized. The timeframe was changed from the Prohibition era to the postwar era.  Chicago became an unnamed fairly-nondescript big city. Al Capone was referred to only as the shadowy "Big Fellow" and photographed only from the rear and was a more diversified mobster rather than primarily a bootlegger (reflecting the change in US organized crime following Prohibition's repeal). Also, of course, IRS Criminal Investigator Frank Wilson became IRS Criminal Investigator Frank Warren.

Nevertheless, the film authentically portrayed the efforts of Wilson's team to put together a tax evasion case against Capone, and in many respects, despite the name changes and nondescript settings, the film is a far more accurate depiction of the investigation than later films on the same subject like The Untouchables.

For example, in The Untouchables the judge presiding over Capone's trial abruptly changes juries in the middle of the case, something that would never happen in real life. What actually happened was that the judge switched jury panels just before the trial began, and the incident is accurately portrayed in The Undercover Man.

Critical response
Bosley Crowther panned the film in The New York Times: "Furthermore—and this is fatal—it is a drearily static film, for all its explosive flurries of gun-play and passing of violent threats. The big crisis in the picture comes when the Treasury man, played by Glenn Ford, is uncertain whether to stick with the case or retire to a farm. And the basis of his decision to go on sleuthing for Uncle Sam is a long-winded lecture on justice which a sad-eyed Italian woman gives. Mr. Ford, in a battered gray hat and a baggy suit, makes a pretty case for higher salaries to civil servants but a not very impressive sleuth. And James Whitmore, who played the sergeant in Command Decision on the stage, seems much more inclined to low clowning than to accounting as an assistant on the case. Barry Kelley is robustly arrogant as "the big fellow's" lawyer and front-man, with several other performers doing standard character roles."

The staff at Variety magazine gave the film a positive review, writing: "Narrated in a straightforward, hardhitting documentary style, The Undercover Man is a good crime-busting saga. Standout features are the pic's sustained pace and its realistic quality. Fresh, natural dialog help to cover up the formula yarn, while topnotch performances down the line carry conviction. Joseph H. Lewis's direction also mutes the melodramatic elements but manages to keep the tension mounting through a series of violent episodes."

Time Out film guide lauded the film and wrote, "A superior crime thriller in the semi-documentary style beloved by Hollywood in the late 1940s...[the film] achieves an authenticity rare in the genre. Perhaps even more impressive is the acknowledgment that mob crime affects not only cops and criminals, but innocents too: witnesses are silenced, bystanders injured. And Lewis - one of the B movie greats - directs in admirably forthright, muscular fashion, making superb use of Burnett Guffey's gritty monochrome camerawork."

References

External links
 
 
 
 
 

1949 films
1949 crime drama films
American crime thriller films
American black-and-white films
Columbia Pictures films
1940s English-language films
Films scored by George Duning
Films based on non-fiction books
Films directed by Joseph H. Lewis
American crime drama films
Film noir
1940s crime thriller films
1940s American films